Zenke is a surname. Notable people with the surname include:

Martin Zenke (born 1953), German biochemist and cell biologist
Simon Zenke (born 1988), Nigerian footballer
Thomas Zenke (born 1993), Nigerian footballer

See also
 Zenk
 Zenker
 Zinke